Lewis Smalley Homestead, also known as Lewisburg-Sycamores, is a historic home located on a property along Route 103 at the mouth of the Aughwick Creek where it meets the Juniata River in Shirley Township in Huntingdon County, Pennsylvania. It was built about 1794, and is a -story stone building, three-bays wide and measuring 30 feet by 25 feet. It has a tin-covered gable roof and was made of sandstone taken from the river. The house retains the original woodwork, doors, hardware and unfinished chestnut flooring, as well as three original stone fireplaces. Also on the property is a stone bank barn, measuring 45 feet by 90 feet. Original hardware from the local blacksmith survives in the barn. One hinge still bears the blacksmith's mark.

During the last week of June 1863, during the Civil War and just prior to the battle of Gettysburg, the property was used as part of a Union garrison –- a contingent of more than 1500 troops stationed at various locations around Mount Union. Its purpose was to guard the road, valley, and bridge to prevent the possible capture and destruction of the Pennsylvania railroad by Confederate troops. In the barn, where the garrison's horses were stabled, soldiers carved their names, initials, and dates in door jambs and barn beams. The carvings are still visible. The farm was occupied by the William Hainey Briggs family during the time of the Union encampment.

The original 540-acre property passed intact within the Smalley family until about 1957 when the last descendant sold it. An interim owner, Tuscarora Land Company, subdivided the original acreage in 1975. The Smalley residence now occupies 28 acres.

It was listed on the National Register of Historic Places in 1978.

References 

Houses on the National Register of Historic Places in Pennsylvania
Houses completed in 1794
Houses in Huntingdon County, Pennsylvania
National Register of Historic Places in Huntingdon County, Pennsylvania
1794 establishments in Pennsylvania